Argyractoides productalis is a moth in the family Crambidae. It is found in Peru.

References

Acentropinae
Moths of South America
Moths described in 1917